Marianna Moszyńska (1710–?), was a Polish composer and writer. She was a nun in the Benedictine Monastery in Sandomierz. She wrote about ten musical manuscripts and compositions for Antiphonary, working with the musicians associated with the convent. Her ability was famed and Christian Joseph Ruth dedicated several works to her.

References

 Magdalena Walter-Mazur: Poklasztorne rękopisy XVIII-wiecznej muzyki wokalno-instrumentalnej i instrumentalnej w zbiorach Biblioteki Diecezjalnej w Sandomierzu. Muzeum Historii Polski cykl "Hereditas Monasteriorum" 3, 2013.

1710 births
18th-century deaths
18th-century Polish–Lithuanian writers
Polish composers
18th-century composers
18th-century Polish Roman Catholic nuns
18th-century women composers
Polish women composers